FK Lovćen is a permanent member of the Montenegrin First League since 2007. Their greatest success in the First League was 2nd place with 59 points during the season 2013/14.

Records

Largest victory: 6:0, Lovćen – Petrovac, 30 April 2017, Cetinje
Largest defeat: 1:6, Lovćen – Sutjeska, 1 December 2012, Cetinje; 5:0, Budućnost - Lovćen, 19 November 2016, Podgorica; 7:2, Mladost - Lovćen, 27 May 2017, Podgorica
Longest unbeaten streak: 11 matches, (6 December 2013 − 3 May 2014)
Longest winning streak: 7 matches, (6 December 2013 − 19 April 2014)
Longest streak without win: 12 matches, (29 September 2012 − 9 March 2013)
Longest losing streak: 7 matches, (3 November 2012 − 9 March 2013)

Appearances

First match in the First League, Lovćen played at 11 August 2007. against OFK Petrovac in Cetinje - 2:2, with attendance od 2,000 supporters. In their first season in the First League Lovćen finished sixth. That was a big success for a club which debuted in the First League.

During the season 2008/09, Lovćen finished as eight team in the championship, but they made good result in the Montenegrin Cup, as a runner-up. One year after, Lovćen finished at sixth place, and at the end of 2010/11 season, Lovćen finished eighth. 

Difficult times for Lovćen came at the 2011/12 season, but after long struggle, Lovćen survived in the First League, with the final placement at the sixth place. Next year, club from Cetinje again made a row of bad results, but at the end finished as a ninth team in the League.

The most successful season in the club's history was 2013/14.  After the first half-season, club from Cetinje finished third. During the spring-season, the club made a historical run of 11 matches without a loss (7 consecutive wins) and Lovćen ran for the champions title. Lovćen finished season at the second place. 

At the same season, on 21 May 2014, for the first time in club's history, Lovćen won the trophy of Montenegrin Cup winner. During the Montenegrin Cup 2014, Lovćen eliminated Zora (1:0), Crvena stijena (8:0, 1:2), Zeta (1:0, 1:2) and Petrovac (3:0, 0:0). In the finals, Lovćen won the game against Mladost, so the club from Cetinje won their first national trophy in history. With that success, for the first time in the club's history, Lovćen qualified for the European Cups.

Final placement by seasons

Opponents

Matches by seasons

During their participations in the First League, Lovćen played against 17 different opponents.

Scores

Attendance
Below is the list of attendance at FK Lovćen First League home games by every single season.

Managers

Since their promotion to the First League, Lovćen was led by 10 different coaches.

See also
 FK Lovćen
 FK Lovćen in European competitions
 Cetinje

External links 
 FK Lovćen official website
 FK Lovćen official fanpage
 FK Lovćen at Twitter
 UEFA profile
 Soccerway profile

FK Lovćen Cetinje